Epilampra maya, the Maya cockroach, is a species of cockroach in the family Blaberidae. It is found in Central America and North America.

References

Cockroaches
Articles created by Qbugbot
Insects described in 1902